Bryotropha patockai is a moth of the family Gelechiidae. It is found in the Czech Republic, Slovakia, Hungary, Croatia and Ukraine.

The wingspan is 14–15 mm. The forewings are dark ochreous grey. The hindwings are nearly unicolourous greyish brown. Adults have been recorded on wing from June to July.

References

Moths described in 2003
patockai
Moths of Europe